Kirk Wise (born August 24, 1963) is an American film director, animator and screenwriter best known for his work at Walt Disney Animation Studios. Wise has directed Disney animated films such as Beauty and the Beast, The Hunchback of Notre Dame, and Atlantis: The Lost Empire. He also directed the English-language translation of Hayao Miyazaki's Spirited Away. He frequently works with Gary Trousdale and Don Hahn.

Career
Wise graduated from Palo Alto High School and went on to study character animation at California Institute of the Arts.  Early in his career, Wise worked as an animator on Disney's Sport Goofy in Soccermania (1987), The Great Mouse Detective (1986) and The Brave Little Toaster (1987), as well as Steven Spielberg's Amazing Stories episode "Family Dog".

Returning to Walt Disney Feature Animation, he began work on The Great Mouse Detective (1986) as an assistant animator, but eventually joined the story department, where he was reunited with former CalArts classmate, Gary Trousdale.

After working as storyboard artists on The Rescuers Down Under and The Prince and the Pauper, Wise and Trousdale were responsible for helming the celebrated Beauty and the Beast (1991), the first animated feature to be nominated for an Academy Award for Best Picture.

Filmography

Collaborations

Gary Trousdale and Kirk Wise have cast certain actors in more than one of their films.

References

External links
 
 Kirk Wise at Filmbug

1963 births
Living people
Animators from California
American storyboard artists
American animated film directors
American animated film producers
Animation screenwriters
California Institute of the Arts alumni
Walt Disney Animation Studios people
Film directors from San Francisco
Palo Alto High School alumni
American voice directors